All-Blacks Nunataks is a group of conspicuous nunataks lying midway between Wallabies Nunataks and Wilhoite Nunataks at the southeast margin of the Byrd Névé in Antarctica. Named by the New Zealand Geological Survey Antarctic Expedition (1960–61) for the well known New Zealand national rugby union team.

Features

 Alexander Cone
 Bledisloe Glacier
 Geddes Crag
 MacFarlane Bluff
 Mount Mace
 Mount Waterhouse
 Skellerup Glacier
 Woodgate Crest

References
 

Nunataks of Oates Land
Glaciology